Cathorops dasycephalus, the big-belly sea catfish, is a species of sea catfish. It is found in clear waters at depth between 10 and 30 m in the eastern Pacific from central Mexico to Ecuador. Maximum recorded body length is 29 cm.

References

Ariidae
Fish described in 1864
Taxa named by Albert Günther